Roaring Fork Falls, also called Roaring Creek Falls, is a waterfall in the Pisgah National Forest, in North Carolina.

Geology
The falls is located on Roaring Fork, a tributary of the South Toe River, which itself is a tributary of the French Broad River.  The creek is located in a forest that's filled with rhododendron and eastern hemlock.  The creek is abundant with freshwater snails.

Height
There are some disputes as to the height of the falls.  Kevin Adams' book, North Carolina Waterfalls, lists the height as "about 45 ft (17 m) high".  North Carolina Waterfalls lists the falls as being 100 feet (30.9 m) "long".

Visiting the Falls
From the intersection of NC 80 and the Blue Ridge Parkway, go 2.2 miles north on NC 80 and turn left on South Toe River Road.  Cross the bridge and turn left.  Follow the road 0.2 miles to the gate and parking area.  From here, follow the trail (passing concrete bunkers formerly used to store explosives) for 0.61 mi. (1.34 km) to a side trail that will lead to the falls in 300 ft (93 m).

Nearby Falls
Setrock Creek Falls
Mitchell Falls
Douglas Falls
Walker Falls
Whiteoak Creek Falls
Crabtree Falls

References

Roaring Fork Falls on NCWaterfalls.com

Video overview of Roaring Fork Falls
Waterfalls of North Carolina
Protected areas of Yancey County, North Carolina
Pisgah National Forest
Waterfalls of Yancey County, North Carolina